Tabasco Nahuatl or Nawat of Tabasco is a moribund Nahuan language spoken in Cupilco in the Mexican state of Tabasco.

The language belongs to the eastern branch of the Nahuan language family, and exhibits a number of divergent features.

References

Nahuatl